Enriqueta González Rubín (17 April 1832 – 9 November 1877) was a Spanish writer.  Her 1875 Viaxe del tío Pacho el Sordo a Uviedo is the earliest known novel published in Asturian.

Early life and career 
Relatively little is known about González Rubín's life. She was born on 17 April 1832 in Santianes, Ribadesella, Asturias. Her mother died when González Rubín was young.

González Rubín's work Viaxe del tío Pacho el Sordo a Uviedo (Uncle Pacho the Deaf's Trip to Oviedo) was published in 1875; it is the earliest known published novel (and earliest known separately published narrative work) in Asturian.

Many of González Rubín's works were published in the newspaper El Faro Asturiano. In 1890, Protasio González Solís, the paper's director, published several works that González Rubín had written for the paper in his Memorias Asturianas using the pseudonyms "La Gallina Vieja" (The Old Hen), "La Cantora del Sella" (The [Female] Singer from Sella), and "Una Aldeana del Sella" (A [Female] Villager from Sella).

Personal life and death 
When González Rubín was 22, she had a son out of wedlock; he died at three months old.  She married Juan Echevarría Barrera, also from Ribadesella, five years later. They had eight children together.

González Rubín died on 9 November 1877 in Infiesto, Piloña, Asturias.

Legacy 
In 2003, the Asturian Ministry of Culture established the Enriqueta González Rubín Prize (Premiu Enriqueta González Rubín) in her honor, which recognizes excellence in Asturian-language journalism.

A street in Ribadesella is named after González Rubín.

References

Further reading 

 
 
 
 

1832 births
1877 deaths
Writers from Asturias
19th-century Spanish journalists
Spanish women journalists
19th-century Spanish novelists
19th-century Spanish women writers
19th-century Spanish writers
Spanish women novelists
People from Ribadesella
Asturian-language writers
19th-century women journalists